Ruth Putnam may refer to:

 Ruth Anna Putnam (1927–2019), American philosopher
Ruth Putnam (author) (1856–1931), author and early graduate of Sage Hall at Cornell University
Ruth Putnam, daughter of Ann Putnam in The Crucible, a play by Arthur Miller